Baba Khvarazm may refer to:

Baba Khvarazm-e Karim
Baba Khvarazm-e Mojir
Baba Khvarazm-e Olya